The 2nd Flight Training Squadron is a unit of the Japan Air Self-Defense Force. It is also sometimes known as the 2nd Flying Training Squadron. It comes under the authority of 11th Flight Training Wing of Air Training Command. It is based at Shizuhama Air Base in Shizuoka Prefecture.

References

Units of the Japan Air Self-Defense Force